Patricia Rodríguez may refer to:
 Patricia Rodriguez (artist) (born 1944), Chicana artist and educator
 Patricia Rodríguez (athlete) (born 1970), Colombian sprinter
 Patricia Yurena Rodríguez (born 1990), Spanish actress, model and beauty queen